6'''-hydroxyneomycin C oxidase (neoG (gene)) is an enzyme with systematic name 6'''-deamino-6'''-hydroxyneomycin C:oxygen 6'''-oxidoreductase. This enzyme catalyses the following chemical reaction

 6'''-deamino-6'''-hydroxyneomycin C + O2  6'''-deamino-6'''-oxoneomycin C + H2O2

This enzyme participates in biosynthesis of aminoglycoside antibiotics of the neomycin family.

References

External links 
 

EC 1.1.3